José Filipe Abreu (born 28 March 1948) is a Portuguese gymnast. He competed in the 1968 Summer Olympics.

References

1948 births
Living people
Gymnasts at the 1968 Summer Olympics
Portuguese male artistic gymnasts
Olympic gymnasts of Portugal
Sportspeople from Lisbon
20th-century Portuguese people